Thangathile Vairam is a 1975 Indian Tamil-language film directed by K. Sornam, starring Sivakumar, Kamal Haasan, Jayachitra and Sripriya. The film's story was written by Kalaignanam.

Plot

Cast 
 Sivakumar as Ravi
 Kamal Haasan as Kumar
 Jayachitra
 Sripriya
 V. K. Ramasamy
 Thengai Srinivasan
 Manorama
 Mythili
 Vennira Aadai Moorthy
 I. S. R.
 Pushpa
 Shanthi

Production 
The film directed by K. Sornam, and story written by Kalaignanam.

Soundtrack 
The music was composed by Shankar–Ganesh, with lyrics by Vaali.

Reception 
Kanthan of Kalki called the story ordinary, but appreciated the direction by Sornam. The film failed at the box-office.

References

External links 

1970s Tamil-language films
1975 films
Films directed by K. Sornam
Films scored by Shankar–Ganesh